Ras Lanuf Oil and Gas Processing Company (Rasco) is a subsidiary of the state-owned National Oil Corporation of Libya. Rasco operates the Ras Lanuf Refinery.

Products
Ra's Lanuf is a topping and reforming oil refinery. It became operational in 1984 and produces an estimated . It is a simple hydroskimming refinery, but its products meet market specifications due to high quality crude oil. Rasco produces fuel oil, gas oil, Liquefied petroleum gas, naphtha and kerosene. The refinery also produces petrochemicals, utilizing naphtha as a feed stock to an ethylene plant with a capacity of 1.2 million tpy (tons per year). Its main products are ethylene (330,000 tpy), propylene (170,000 tpy), Mix C4 (130,000 tpy) and P Gasoline (335,000 tpy).

Background

The first construction phase for the Ra's Lanuf petrochemical complex began during April 1987. Rasco contracted Hemijska Industria Pancevo (Yugoslavia) to manage the complex. During the first two years production was well below capacity. It began increasing in 1989 and by 1994 operated at about 85% of capacity. The operation was impacted by UN sanctions, specifically Security Council Resolution 883 of November 11, 1993, which banned Libya from importing refinery equipment. Performance improved after the UN suspended sanctions in April 1999. The ethylene cracker was closed for a four-week maintenance in May 1999. The second phase was scheduled to finish in 1994, with Monenco as manager. However, the venture ran into numerous obstacles. In 1985, Tecnimont won a $50 million management contract, but when the contract expired in 1990, Rasco appointed Monenco. In October 1989, the first contract was awarded to a consortium consisting of Energoinvest, Hemijska Industria Pancevo, INA-Project and Brown & Root. In 1990, Brown & Root ended its participation and was replaced by Technip. In February 1991, Hyundai Engineering and Construction was awarded a $200 million contract for the polyethylene unit, with John Brown Engineering acting as sub-contractor. Included in the contract was a hydrogen and ethylene purification unit. By the end of 1992, Uhde GmbH (German subsidiary of ThyssenKrupp) won the contract. In 1993, Rasco terminated the construction contract due to the consortia failure to fulfill its terms.

Expansion
During early June 2007, National Oil Corporation was evaluating investment proposals for upgrading Ra's Lanuf. The total cost of the upgrade is estimated at $2 billion. These expansions will permit the production of benzene, butadiene, and methyl tert-butyl ether. On April 19, 2007, National Oil Corporation and the Dow Chemical Company announced plans to participate in a joint venture to operate and expand the Ra's Lanuf complex. The joint venture agreement encompasses the Ra's Lanuf site's existing naphtha cracker, two polyethylene production facilities and associated infrastructure. The project will include refurbishment and expansion of the existing units, followed by construction of an ethane cracker and additional polyethylene and polypropylene facilities.  Later phases will include construction of additional hydrocarbon, plastics and chemical production facilities based on natural gas. Dow is the first global chemical company to participate in Libya.

Notes

External links

Official website
Mineral Industry of Libya 2004

Ras Lanuf
Oil and gas companies of Libya
Tripolitania